USS LSM-105 was a  of the United States Navy, commissioned at Brown Shipyards in Houston, Texas, on 15 November 1944. During the remainder of World War II, it served in the Pacific.

References

Landing ships of the United States Navy
1944 ships